In geophysics and physical geodesy, a geopotential model is the theoretical analysis of measuring and calculating the effects of Earth's gravitational field (the geopotential).

Newton's law

Newton's law of universal gravitation states that the gravitational force F acting between two point masses m1 and m2 with centre of mass separation r is given by

where G is the gravitational constant and r̂ is the radial unit vector. For a non-pointlike object of continuous mass distribution, each mass element dm can be treated as mass distributed over a small volume, so the volume integral over the extent of object 2 gives:

with corresponding gravitational potential

where ρ = ρ(x, y, z) is the mass density at the volume element and of the direction from the volume element to point mass 1.  is the gravitational potential energy per unit mass.

The case of a homogeneous sphere

In the special case of a sphere with a spherically symmetric mass density then ρ = ρ(s); i.e., density depends only on the radial distance

These integrals can be evaluated analytically. This is the shell theorem saying that in this case:

with corresponding potential

where M = ∫Vρ(s)dxdydz is the total mass of the sphere.

Spherical harmonics representation

In reality, Earth is not exactly spherical, mainly because of its rotation around the polar axis that makes its shape slightly oblate. If this shape were perfectly known together with the exact mass density ρ = ρ(x, y, z), the integrals and  could be evaluated with numerical methods to find a more accurate model for Earth's gravitational field. However, the situation is in fact the opposite. By observing the orbits of spacecraft and the Moon, Earth's gravitational field can be determined quite accurately and the best estimate of Earth's mass is obtained by dividing the product GM as determined from the analysis of spacecraft orbit with a value for G determined to a lower relative accuracy using other physical methods.

Background

From the defining equations and  it is clear (taking the partial derivatives of the integrand) that outside the body in empty space the following differential equations are valid for the field caused by the body:

Functions of the form  where (r, θ, φ) are the spherical coordinates which satisfy the partial differential equation (the Laplace equation) are called spherical harmonic functions.

They take the forms:

where spherical coordinates (r, θ, φ) are used, given here in terms of cartesian (x, y, z) for reference:

The first spherical harmonics with n = 0, 1, 2, 3 are presented in the table below.

{| class="wikitable"
|-
! n !! Spherical harmonics 
|-
| 0
| 
|-
|rowspan="3"| 1
| 
|-
| 
|-
| 
|-
|rowspan="5"| 2
| 
|-
| 
|-
| 
|-
| 
|-
| 
|-
|rowspan="7"| 3
| 
|-
| 
|-
| 
|-
| 
|-
| 
|-
| 
|-
| 
|}

Application
The model for Earth's gravitational potential is a sum

where  and the coordinates are relative the standard geodetic reference system extended into space with origin in the center of the reference ellipsoid and with z-axis in the direction of the polar axis.

The zonal terms refer to terms of the form:

and the tesseral terms terms refer to terms of the form:

The coefficients for the n=1 with both m=0 and m=1 term correspond to an arbitrarily oriented dipole term in the multi-pole expansion. Gravity does not physically exhibit any dipole character and so the integral characterizing n = 1 must be zero.

The different coefficients Jn, Cnm, Snm, are then given the values for which the best possible agreement between the computed and the observed spacecraft orbits is obtained.

As P0n(x) = −P0n(−x) non-zero coefficients Jn for odd n correspond to a lack of symmetry "north–south" relative the equatorial plane for the mass distribution of Earth. Non-zero coefficients Cnm, Snm correspond to a lack of rotational symmetry around the polar axis for the mass distribution of Earth, i.e. to a "tri-axiality" of Earth.

For large values of n the coefficients above (that are divided by r(n + 1) in ) take very large values when for example kilometers and seconds are used as units. In the literature it is common to introduce some arbitrary "reference radius" R close to Earth's radius and to work with the dimensionless coefficients

and to write the potential as

Largest terms

Relative the coordinate system

illustrated in figure 1 the components of the force caused by the "J2 term" are

In the rectangular coordinate system (x, y, z) with unit vectors (x̂ ŷ ẑ) the force components are:

The components of the force corresponding to the "J3 term"

are

and

The exact numerical values for the coefficients deviate (somewhat) between different Earth models but for the lowest coefficients they all agree almost exactly.

For the JGM-3 model (see below) the values are:

 μ = 398600.440 km3⋅s−2
 J2 = 1.75553 × 1010 km5⋅s−2
 J3 = −2.61913 × 1011 km6⋅s−2

For example, at a radius of 6600 km (about 200 km above Earth's surface) J3/(J2r) is about 0.002; i.e., the correction to the "J2 force" from the "J3 term" is in the order of 2 permille. The negative value of J3 implies that for a point mass in Earth's equatorial plane the gravitational force is tilted slightly towards the south due to the lack of symmetry for the mass distribution of Earth's "north–south".

Derivation

The spherical harmonics are derived from the approach of looking for harmonic functions of the form

where (r, θ, φ) are the spherical coordinates defined by the equations. By straightforward calculations one gets that for any function f

Introducing the expression in  one gets that

As the term 

only depends on the variable  and the sum

only depends on the variables θ and φ. One gets that φ is harmonic if and only if 

and

for some constant .

From then follows that

The first two terms only depend on the variable  and the third only on the variable .

From the definition of φ as a spherical coordinate it is clear that Φ(φ) must be periodic with the period 2π and one must therefore have that

and

for some integer m as the family of solutions to  then are 

With the variable substitution 

equation takes the form

From follows that in order to have a solution  with

one must have that

If Pn(x) is a solution to the differential equation

one therefore has that the potential corresponding to m = 0

which is rotationally symmetric around the z-axis is a harmonic function

If  is a solution to the differential equation

with m ≥ 1 one has the potential

where a and b are arbitrary constants is a harmonic function that depends on φ and therefore is not rotationally symmetric around the z-axis

The differential equation is the Legendre differential equation for which the Legendre polynomials defined

are the solutions.

The first six Legendre polynomials are:

The solutions to differential equation are the associated Legendre functions

One therefore has that

Recursive algorithms used for the numerical propagation of spacecraft orbits

Spacecraft orbits are computed by the numerical integration of the equation of motion. For this the gravitational force, i.e. the gradient of the potential, must be computed.

Available models

The earliest Earth models in general use by NASA and ESRO/ESA were the "Goddard Earth Models" developed by Goddard Space Flight Center denoted "GEM-1", "GEM-2", "GEM-3", and so on. Later the "Joint Earth Gravity Models" denoted "JGM-1", "JGM-2", "JGM-3" developed by Goddard Space Flight Center in cooperation with universities and private companies became available. The newer models generally provided higher order terms than their precursors. The EGM96 uses Nz = Nt = 360 resulting in 130317 coefficients. An EGM2008 model is available as well.

For a normal Earth satellite requiring an orbit determination/prediction accuracy of a few meters the "JGM-3" truncated to Nz = Nt = 36 (1365 coefficients) is usually sufficient. Inaccuracies from the modeling of the air-drag and to a lesser extent the solar radiation pressure will exceed the inaccuracies caused by the gravitation modeling errors.

According to JGM-3 one therefore has that J =  × 6378.1363 ×  =  and
J =  × 6378.1363 ×  = .

Further reading
 El'Yasberg Theory of flight of artificial earth satellites, Israel program for Scientific Translations (1967)
 Lerch, F.J., Wagner, C.A., Smith, D.E., Sandson, M.L., Brownd, J.E., Richardson, J.A.,"Gravitational Field Models for the Earth (GEM1&2)", Report X55372146, Goddard Space Flight Center, Greenbelt/Maryland, 1972
 Lerch, F.J., Wagner, C.A., Putney, M.L., Sandson, M.L., Brownd, J.E., Richardson, J.A., Taylor, W.A., "Gravitational Field Models GEM3 and 4", Report X59272476, Goddard Space Flight Center, Greenbelt/Maryland, 1972
 Lerch, F.J., Wagner, C.A., Richardson, J.A., Brownd, J.E., "Goddard Earth Models (5 and 6)", Report X92174145, Goddard Space Flight Center, Greenbelt/Maryland, 1974
  Lerch, F.J., Wagner, C.A., Klosko, S.M., Belott, R.P., Laubscher, R.E., Raylor, W.A., "Gravity Model Improvement Using Geos3 Altimetry (GEM10A and 10B)", 1978 Spring Annual Meeting of the American Geophysical Union, Miami, 1978
 Lerch, F.J., Klosko, S.M., Laubscher, R.E., Wagner, C.A., "Gravity Model Improvement Using Geos3 (GEM9 and 10)", Journal of Geophysical Research, Vol. 84, B8, p. 3897-3916, 1979
 Lerch, F.J., Klosko, S.M., Patel, G.B., "A Refined Gravity Model from Lageos (GEML2)", 'NASA Technical Memorandum 84986, Goddard Space Flight Center, Greenbelt/Maryland, 1983
 Lerch, F.J., Nerem, R.S., Putney, B.H., Felsentreger, T.L., Sanchez, B.V., Klosko, S.M., Patel, G.B., Williamson, R.G., Chinn, D.S., Chan, J.C., Rachlin, K.E., Chandler, N.L., McCarthy, J.J., Marshall, J.A., Luthcke, S.B., Pavlis, D.W., Robbins, J.W., Kapoor, S., Pavlis, E.C., " Geopotential Models of the Earth from Satellite Tracking, Altimeter and Surface Gravity Observations: GEMT3 and GEMT3S", NASA Technical Memorandum 104555, Goddard Space Flight Center, Greenbelt/Maryland, 1992
 Lerch, F.J., Nerem, R.S., Putney, B.H., Felsentreger, T.L., Sanchez, B.V., Marshall, J.A., Klosko, S.M., Patel, G.B., Williamson, R.G., Chinn, D.S., Chan, J.C., Rachlin, K.E., Chandler, N.L., McCarthy, J.J., Luthcke, S.B., Pavlis, N.K., Pavlis, D.E., Robbins, J.W., Kapoor, S., Pavlis, E.C., "A Geopotential Model from Satellite Tracking, Altimeter and Surface Gravity Data: GEMT3", Journal of Geophysical Research, Vol. 99, No. B2, p. 2815-2839, 1994
 Nerem, R.S., Lerch, F.J., Marshall, J.A., Pavlis, E.C., Putney, B.H., Tapley, B.D., Eanses, R.J., Ries, J.C., Schutz, B.E., Shum, C.K., Watkins, M.M., Klosko, S.M., Chan, J.C., Luthcke, S.B., Patel, G.B., Pavlis, N.K., Williamson, R.G., Rapp, R.H., Biancale, R., Nouel, F., "Gravity Model Developments for Topex/Poseidon: Joint Gravity Models 1 and 2", Journal of Geophysical Research, Vol. 99, No. C12, p. 24421-24447, 1994a
 Tapley, B. D.  M. M. Watkins, J. C. Ries, G. W. Davis, R. J. Eanes, S. R. Poole, H. J. Rim, B. E. Schutz, C. K. Shum, R. S. Nerem, F. J. Lerch, J. A. Marshall, S. M. Klosko, N. K. Pavlis, and R. G. Williamson, “The Joint Gravity Model 3,” J. Geophys. Res., vol. 101, No. B12, ,December 1996

External links 

 http://cddis.nasa.gov/lw13/docs/papers/sci_lemoine_1m.pdf
 http://geodesy.geology.ohio-state.edu/course/refpapers/Tapley_JGR_JGM3_96.pdf

Spaceflight concepts
Gravity
Earth orbits